is a Japanese actress. She won the award for best supporting actress at the 3rd Japan Academy Prize and at the 4th Hochi Film Award for Vengeance Is Mine and The Three Undelivered Letters.

In 2008, Ogawa got ordained as a Shingon Buddhist nun. In an interview with J-Cast News, she mentioned that during her tonsure ceremony, only one strand of hair was pulled out. She remains involved in the entertainment industry.

Filmography

Film
 Mother (1963)
 Night Ladies (1964)
 Night Scandal (1964)
 Convicted Woman (1966)
 Nakano Spy School (1966)
 Shiroi Kyotō (1966)
 Zatoichi's Vengeance (1966)
 If You Were Young: Rage (1970)
 \300 Million Thief Immune to Charges Begins (1975)
 The Fossil (1975)
 The Demon (1978)
 Vengeance Is Mine (1979)
 Glowing Autumn (1979)
 The Three Undelivered Letters (1979)
 Shikake-nin Baian (1981)
 The Go Masters (1983)
 Farewell to the Ark (1984)
 The Political Game (1989)

Television
 Minamoto no Yoshitsune (1966) – Shiobu
 Three Outlaw Samurai (1966) – Oshima
 Karei-naru Ichizoku (1974–75) – Aiko Takasu / Narrator
 Akō Rōshi (1979) – Yūgiri Tayū
 Takeda Shingen (1988) – Yae
 Aoi Tokugawa Sandai (2000) – Yodo-dono

Dubbing roles
 Cleopatra (1975 NTV edition) – Cleopatra (Elizabeth Taylor)

References

1939 births
Living people
Actresses from Tokyo
Japanese Buddhist nuns
21st-century Buddhist nuns